George Archibald McCall (March 16, 1802 – February 25, 1868) was a United States Army officer who became a brigadier general and prisoner of war during the American Civil War.  He was also a naturalist.

Biography
McCall was born in Philadelphia, Pennsylvania, to Archibald McCall (1767–1843), a descendant of the Schuyler family and the Van Cortlandt family through his ancestors Stephanus Van Cortlandt and Gertrude Schuyler, and Elizabeth Cadwalader.

He was appointed from Pennsylvania to the United States Military Academy at West Point, graduating in 1822, 26th in his class of 40. His service took him to Florida, especially the Pensacola area. He enjoyed his time in Pensacola, writing frequently of his life there as a 2nd Lieutenant. He was promoted to 1st Lieutenant after seven years and, in 1846, to the rank of captain. He was assigned to the 1st U.S. Infantry then the 4th U.S. Infantry before serving as aide-de-camp to Gen. Edmund P. Gaines into the beginning of the Second Seminole War. He distinguished himself during the Mexican–American War under Zachary Taylor, receiving brevet promotions to major for gallantry at Palo Alto and to lieutenant colonel for Resaca de la Palma. Appreciative leading Philadelphians presented him a sword upon his return to the city in 1847. On August 30, 1851, at the age of 49, he was married to Elizabeth McMurtrie. The marriage was a happy one, and at least two sons and one daughter were born to the couple. He retired with 31 years service as colonel and Inspector General of the Army in 1853.

He was elected as a member of the American Philosophical Society in 1854.

At the beginning of the Civil War, McCall helped organize Pennsylvania volunteers as major general of the state militia and was commissioned brigadier general of volunteers in May 1861. He helped organize and led the famous Pennsylvania Reserves Division, which served as the 2nd Division, I Corps, Army of the Potomac, and 3rd Division, V Corps. He was one of the oldest West Point graduates to serve in the war.

McCall served in the Peninsula Campaign and was wounded and captured at Frayser's Farm, Virginia, in June 1862. While trying to ascertain his position without his staff officers, he instead met the 47th Virginia, part of General James Longstreet's command. Longstreet had served as a brevet Second Lieutenant under Mccall in the 4th U.S. Infantry. He was imprisoned in Libby Prison in Richmond, Virginia. Previous illness was aggravated by his confinement in prison, and after his exchange (for Simon Bolivar Buckner) in August, McCall resigned due to poor health in March 1863.

In retirement, McCall farmed in Pennsylvania. He died at his "Belair" estate in West Chester, Pennsylvania on February 25, 1868, and is buried in the Christ Church Burial Ground in his native Philadelphia.

McCall School in Society Hill, Center City, Philadelphia is named after him.

McCall is commemorated in the scientific name of a species of lizard, Phrynosoma mcallii.

Family tree

See also

List of American Civil War generals (Union)

References

Boatner, Mark M. III, The Civil War Dictionary: Revised Edition, David McKay Company, Inc., 1984.
 Eicher, John H., and Eicher, David J., Civil War High Commands, Stanford University Press, 2001, .
 McCall, George Archibald, "Letters from the Frontiers", Applewood Books, Bedford Mass, www.awb.com, 1868, 538 p., 
 Warner, Ezra J., Generals in Blue: Lives of the Union Commanders, Louisiana State University Press, 1964, .

External links
 The McCall Family Papers, including correspondence, accounts, papers and other printed materials belonging to George A. McCall, are available for research use at the Historical Society of Pennsylvania.

1802 births
1868 deaths
Military personnel from Philadelphia
Union Army generals
American military personnel of the Mexican–American War
United States Military Academy alumni
People of Pennsylvania in the American Civil War
American Civil War prisoners of war
Pennsylvania Reserves
Burials at Christ Church, Philadelphia
Schuyler family
American people of Dutch descent
People from West Chester, Pennsylvania